Jovan Henry Allen Belcher (July 24, 1987 – December 1, 2012) was an American football linebacker who played his entire career with the Kansas City Chiefs of the National Football League (NFL). He grew up in West Babylon, New York and was a standout high school athlete before  attending and graduating from the University of Maine, where he played for the Maine Black Bears football team. Belcher was named an All-American twice in college after switching in his junior year from linebacker to defensive end.

Belcher was considered a strong small-school NFL prospect, but was not selected in the 2009 NFL Draft. He was later signed as a free agent by the Chiefs and became a regular starter at inside linebacker in 2010. His most productive season was in 2011, when he had 61 tackles and 26 assists. He was re-signed by Kansas City before the 2012 season and played in the team's first 11 games.

Belcher died on December 1, 2012, in a murder-suicide, killing his girlfriend, 22-year-old Kasandra Perkins, before driving to the Chiefs' training facility and shooting himself in the head with a handgun.

Early years
The son of John Belcher and Cheryl Shepard, Belcher grew up on Long Island, New York, and attended West Babylon High School in West Babylon, New York. He wrestled and played football there under head coach Albert Ritacco between 2001 and 2004. He was a three-time All-American as a wrestler, and played as a linebacker, offensive tackle, nose guard, and fullback on the football team. He was captain of the football team for two seasons and led West Babylon to two Long Island Football Championships playoff appearances, although the team did not reach the title game. The team had its first-ever undefeated regular season in 2004, when Belcher was a senior, but lost in the Suffolk County Championship game. The school retired his number 52 jersey, and he returned to the school frequently later in his career to give pregame speeches to the team. Though he had an accomplished high school career, was a second-team All-Long Island selection in 2004, and was named to Newsday'''s list of the best players of the decade for the 2000s, Belcher was not heavily recruited by major college football programs.

College career
Belcher attended the University of Maine, a Division I FCS school, and played on its Black Bears football team. Playing as an outside linebacker, he was fourth on the team in tackles in his first two seasons, registering 58 as a freshman in 2005 and 52 as a sophomore in 2006.

Belcher had a standout season as a junior after he was switched from linebacker to defensive end. The Associated Press named him a second-team All-American, while Sports Network named him a third-team All-American. He led Maine's collegiate conference, the Colonial Athletic Association (CAA), with 10 sacks and 17 tackles for a loss. His sacks total was seventh-highest in the nation.

Belcher was named a second-team preseason All-American by Lindy's Publications before his senior season in 2008, when he also served as a team co-captain. He led the CAA again with 17.5 tackles for losses. He also had 7.5 sacks and was the association's defensive player of the year. After the season, Belcher was named by the American Football Coaches Association and the Walter Camp Foundation as a first-team All-American in the Football Championship Subdivision, a grouping of smaller schools in the National Collegiate Athletic Association's Division I. He was the fourth multiple-time All-American in Black Bears history, following John Huard, Aaron Dashiell, and Stephen Cooper.

Belcher, who was a strong student in high school and college, graduated from Maine with a degree in child development and family relations. "He always did his work, sat right up front," Ritacco, Belcher's high school coach and 10th-grade biology teacher, said later. After graduating from college, he won an Academic Momentum Award from the National Consortium for Academics and Sports' Scholar-Baller Program.

Professional career
Prior to the 2009 NFL Draft, Belcher was considered one of the best small-school prospects and was expected to move to outside linebacker in the NFL. He was projected by Sports Illustrated as a sixth-round draft pick.

Kansas City Chiefs
After going undrafted, Belcher signed a free agent contract with the Chiefs in 2009. At 228 pounds, he was considered small for an inside linebacker, but made three starts as a rookie and played in all of the team's games. He had 33 tackles and two assists as Kansas City finished with a 4–12 win–loss record for last place in the AFC West division. Belcher became a regular starter in the 2010 season, registering 53 tackles and 31 assists. The Chiefs finished with a 10–6 record and reached the playoffs. Kansas City lost 30–7 to the Baltimore Ravens in the wild card round; Belcher had one and a half sacks and nine tackles in the game.

Belcher continued as a starter in the 2011 NFL season, recording 61 tackles and 26 assists. Kansas City finished last in the AFC West with a 7–9 record, and head coach Todd Haley was replaced by defensive coordinator Romeo Crennel with three games remaining in the season. The Chiefs re-signed Belcher in March 2012 to a one-year contract worth around $1.9 million. During the 2012 season, Belcher played in all 11 games, starting 10, prior to his death. He had 33 tackles and five assists as the Chiefs started with a 1–10 record.

Personal life
Belcher was involved in community activities in Kansas City in 2011, visiting a nearby military base and a local elementary school to promote an NFL program for children. He also traveled back to West Babylon every year and gave motivational speeches to students.

Death

By late 2012, Belcher was living with his girlfriend, Kasandra Perkins, and their three-month-old baby, Zoey, at 5401 Crysler Avenue in Kansas City. Belcher and Perkins were introduced through Chiefs running back Jamaal Charles, whose wife was a first cousin of Perkins. Perkins had also done volunteer work in the community, and with the Chiefs as part of its Women's Organization, a group of players' wives and significant others who do charity work and run awareness campaigns. Friends stated that the couple argued frequently, including after Perkins returned home at 1:00 A.M. from a Trey Songz concert at the Midland Theatre on the night of November 30, 2012. After the argument, Perkins went to the Power and Light District, an entertainment area by the Midland and T-Mobile Center in downtown Kansas City. Belcher was also in the Power and Light District with a different woman. After losing the woman in the crowd, Belcher drove to her apartment, but she was not home at the time. The police found him there at 2:50 A.M., after receiving a 911 call about a suspicious person in a car parked on Armour Boulevard. He told the police he was waiting for his girlfriend, and forgot the code to her apartment. The police discussed the temporary tags on the car and urged him to go inside the building, saying they were "trying to cut [him] a break here." Belcher did not smell of alcohol and was not slurring his words, they said. He was later buzzed into the building by neighbors and allowed to stay for the night.

Belcher returned home between 6:30 A.M. and 7:00 A.M., and had another argument with Perkins. In the ensuing argument, Belcher drew a handgun and fatally shot Perkins in front of his mother, Cheryl Shepherd. The police arrived at the house at around 7:50 A.M., following a call from Shepherd, who had recently moved there from West Babylon, New York, to help the couple care for Zoey. The baby was heard crying in the background when Belcher's mother called the police. A 22-year-old Perkins had been shot in the neck, chest, abdomen, hip, back, leg, and hand, a total of nine times.

After murdering Perkins, Belcher drove his 2007 Bentley Continental GT about five miles to a parking lot at the Chiefs' practice facility next to Arrowhead Stadium. He stepped out of the car with a gun pointed to his head when he encountered Chiefs general manager Scott Pioli. Belcher told Pioli that he had just murdered his girlfriend, and thanked him before asking for Pioli and Chiefs owner Clark Hunt to take care of his daughter. Pioli tried to persuade Belcher to drop the gun. Then, Chiefs Head Coach Romeo Crennel, along with linebackers coach Gary Gibbs, arrived and joined the effort. The police were dispatched to the scene at 8:01 A.M. As the sound of sirens approached, Belcher told the men that he had to kill himself and "can't be here." He knelt down by a car, made a sign of the cross, and shot himself in the head. A photograph from the scene showed Perkins's blood smeared over the chrome gearshift of Belcher's vehicle, as well as broken glass on the dashboard.

On January 14, 2013, the Jackson County Medical Examiner's office released autopsy reports, showing that Belcher had a blood alcohol content of 0.170 mg/dL in his system, more than double the legal driving limit in Missouri.

The Chiefs had a game scheduled at Arrowhead against the also-struggling Carolina Panthers the day after the murder-suicide. The game went on as scheduled, following discussions between the NFL, Crennel, and the Chiefs' team captains. No formal mention was made of the shooting at the game, although there was a moment of silence for "victims of domestic violence and their families." The Chiefs defeated the Panthers 27–21.

Belcher had chronic traumatic encephalopathy at the time of his death, according to a medical report.

A service for Belcher was held on December 5 at the Landmark International Deliverance and Worship Center just southwest of Arrowhead Stadium. The Chiefs' practice was scheduled around the event. Pioli and one of Belcher's uncles spoke at the closed service. A funeral for Perkins took place the following day at the Ridgeview Family Fellowship in Blue Ridge, Texas. Another service was held December 8 in Austin, Texas, where her father lives; Perkins was buried in Pflugerville, Texas. Clark Hunt attended the service. Perkins was born in McKinney, Texas, attended elementary and middle school in the Dallas suburb of Garland, and graduated from Anderson High School in Austin in 2009.

The police revealed that the handgun Belcher used to kill his girlfriend was different from the one he used to take his own life. Belcher had other guns at his house, some of which he would use at a shooting range. All were legally owned. The day after the shooting, NBC broadcaster Bob Costas, quoting Jason Whitlock, said during a segment of Sunday Night Football'' that "in the coming days, Jovan Belcher's actions and their possible connection to football will be analyzed. Who knows? But here, wrote Jason Whitlock, is what I believe. If Jovan Belcher didn't possess a gun, he and Kasandra Perkins would both be alive today." The comments prompted criticism and support from both sides of the gun control issue.

Belcher was buried on December 12 at the North Babylon Cemetery in North Babylon, New York, following an open casket funeral at the Upper Room Christian Church in Dix Hills, New York. The hearse passed his childhood home in West Babylon en route to the cemetery.

Wrongful death lawsuit
In December 2013, his body was exhumed from the North Babylon cemetery at the request of his family to conduct tests on whether he had chronic traumatic encephalopathy (CTE). On December 31, 2013, Belcher's mother filed a wrongful death lawsuit in Missouri state court against her son's former team, the Kansas City Chiefs.

The lawsuit claimed that "In the months leading up to Decedent's death, Defendant was aware of Decedent's symptoms and signs of cognitive and neuropsychiatric impairment. Defendant micromanaged virtually every aspect of Decedent's life when it came to his physical abilities to perform in the workplace, including analyzing his diet, speed, strength and body-mass index. Yet when it came to monitoring Decedent's mental health and neurological capacities, Defendant disregarded evidence of impairments and fostered an environment where Decedent was required to play through his injuries and become exposed to further neurological harm."

On September 29, 2014, ESPN released a report completed by a medical examiner, who determined that Belcher had chronic traumatic encephalopathy.

See also

List of American football players who died during their career
List of suicides
List of NFL players with chronic traumatic encephalopathy

References

External links
Kansas City Chiefs bio

1987 births
2012 deaths
2012 in Missouri
2012 murders in the United States
2012 suicides
21st-century American criminals
African-American players of American football
American football defensive ends
American football linebackers
American football players with chronic traumatic encephalopathy
American male criminals
American murderers
Burials in New York (state)
Crime in Kansas City, Missouri
Criminals from New York (state)
Deaths by firearm in Missouri
History of Kansas City, Missouri
Kansas City Chiefs players
Maine Black Bears football players
Male murderers
Murder–suicides in Missouri
People from West Babylon, New York
Players of American football from New York (state)
Sportspeople from Suffolk County, New York
Suicides by firearm in Missouri